WQQP (95.9 FM, "Pop 93.1-95.9FM") is a radio station licensed to Sykesville, Pennsylvania. Owned by Seven Mountains Media, it broadcasts a hot adult contemporary format simulcast from sister station WPQP.

History
The roots of WQQP can be traced back to the early 1980s, when the 95.9 MHz channel was first assigned to Brookville, Pennsylvania; operating then as WMKX, a mostly automated station that played adult contemporary music. In the mid-90s, Renda Broadcasting Corporation, which owned competitors WECZ and WPXZ in Punxsutawney, applied to put a new 25,000 watt station on the air in Brookville at 103.3 MHz. For that station, WKQL, to go on the air, several FM channel shuffles would have to take place.

This affected the operation of WMKX, which under the plan, would move to 105.5 MHz from 95.9. Not long after the changes took place in 2000, the FCC opened a window for a series of low-power FM license applications by non-profit groups or organizations. A local church applied for the 95.9 frequency while it was still fairly fresh in local listeners' minds, and began to broadcast a Contemporary Christian music format under the call letters WWJL and the moniker "Where Jesus Lives".

WWJL continued to operate until May 31, 2007, after it was learned that an FCC license renewal application had not been completed correctly. First Media, which owned stations WOWQ, WCED, and WQYX, immediately filed an application to move the channel from Brookville to Sykesville and increase its power back to its original Class A status it had originally during the early years of WMKX. The station as it is today, WQQP, signed on the air May 5, 2009 as WZDB. To help extend its signal in the east, First Media put a second FM station, WZDD, on the air in Strattanville to be used as a simulcast outlet of WZDB.

In October 2016, First Media reached a deal to sell WZDB, WCPA, WOWQ, WQYX, and WZDD to Seven Mountains Media for $4.5 million. The company had also previously bought First Media's State College, Pennsylvania stations.

On May 30, 2017, WZDB rebranded as "Clear Rock 95.9", while former simulcaster WZDD (now WKFT) 101.3 changed formats to country, simulcasting WOWQ (now WIFT) 102.1 in Du Bois. On March 19, 2018, the station switched to becoming a simulcast of WPQP Pop 93.1. The station changed its call sign to WQQP on March 23, 2018.

References

External links

QQP
Radio stations established in 2009
2009 establishments in Pennsylvania
Hot adult contemporary radio stations in the United States